Uschi Keszler's Pennies in Action Cancer Research Fund,  holding a full 501(c)(3) non-profit foundation status, exists to support research for breast cancer curative programs, including preventative vaccines and other biological therapies  that do not damage the  immune system.

History 
This philanthropic organization was founded in 2008 by Olympic figure skater, coach, inventor of the ice-skating term hydroblading, and choreographer Uschi Keszler who is herself a breast cancer survivor. The Pennies in Action fund recognizes, along with many experts, that vaccines, rather than chemotherapy remain the most advantageous avenue for dealing with cancer. It has consequently targeted as its initial project the breast cancer vaccine research of surgeon and researcher in endocrinology and oncology Brian Czerniecki, M.D., Ph.D. on the staff of the Abramson Cancer Center of the Hospital of the University of Pennsylvania.  Czerniecki has had success in clinical trials and a history of gaining  patents on inventions that increase antigens against cancer.

Research 
Czerniecki’s  extensive research, supported  in part by American Cancer Society and National Institute of Health grants, has already shown the safety and efficacy of delivering mature, peptide-pulsed dendritic cell vaccines in a variety of ways.  His research also has discovered alternate sentinel lymph node mapping possibilities   and opportunities to avoid axillary dissection.  He has discovered that immunohistochemical analysis improves the sensitivity of this procedure.  Currently the Rena Rowan Breast Center of the Abramson Cancer Center is seeking eligible patients to continue clinical trials of Czerneicki’s alternative approach which focuses on the body's immune system and uses the patient’s own cells to develop a vaccine that will attack the cancer cells to prevent the development of invasive breast cancer.

References

External links 
Pennies-in-Action Website
Faculty Profile
Curriculum Vitae of Dr. Brian Czerniecki 
Letter from PENN Medicine
Interview with Dr. Czerniecki
Patent Information
Abramson Cancer Center webpage

Cancer charities in the United States
Charities based in Pennsylvania
Medical and health organizations based in Pennsylvania